Traffic Ramasamy is a 2018 Indian Tamil language biographical drama film co-written and directed by Vicky, an assistant of SA Chandrasekhar on his directorial debut. The film stars veteran film director S. A. Chandrasekhar alongside Rohini, Prakash Raj, Livingston and Ambika in pivotal roles and features Vijay Sethupathi, Vijay Antony, Khushbu, Seeman, and Kasthuri in special appearances.The satellite rights of the film is sold to Colors Tamil.

The film is based on the real-life story of the veteran social activist K. R. Ramaswamy who received the nickname of Traffic Ramaswamy for his activism in controlling traffic related issues in Tamil Nadu. The music for the film is scored by Balamurali Balu with lyrics written by Kabilan Vairamuthu while the cinematography is handled by Kugan S. Palani.

Plot 
Ramaswamy (S. A. Chandrasekhar) is hit by a motorized fish cart and then beaten up by ruffians and left for dead in a gutter.  Then we get into his family to meet his wife (Rohini), son in law (Chetan) and his little granddaughter who admires his every move.  Ramaswamy's 75th birthday is being celebrated at the house and just at the time of cake cutting a call comes and he leaves abruptly to join in a protest against Tasmac where he threatens to jump from a building top and the authorities yield to him and shut shop.  Then the story moves on to explore other protests by the activist and how gets beaten up often.  He files a PIL seeking a ban on the motorized fish carts ("Meen body vandi in Tamil), that involves an MLA, Inspector, political kingpin and mayor who make arrangements to finish him off.

Cast

Main cast 

 S. A. Chandrasekhar as Traffic Ramasamy
 Rohini as Rukku, Traffic Ramasamy's wife
 Upasana RC as Dr. Fatima 
 Prakash Raj as Police Officer
 Livingston as Lawyer
 Ambika as Judge
 Manobala as Judge
 R. K. Suresh as Daniel
 Chetan
 Mohan Raman
 Madhan Bob
 Imman Annachi as Mayor
 Pasi Sathya
 Ammu Ramachandran
 Akila Krishnan

Special appearances 

 Vijay Sethupathi
 Vijay Antony
 Khushbu
 Kasthuri
 Seeman
 S. Ve. Shekher as a judge

Production 
Director Vicky who worked as an assistant director to S. A. Chandrasekhar chose to work on a biopic about Traffic Ramasamy and convinced SA Chandrasekhar to play the lead role of Traffic Ramasamy. The film also marked the full fledged acting debut for S. A. Chandrasekhar in a lead role at the age of 76.

The film started its production venture in December 2017. The production team also recruited Vijay Sethupathi to play a cameo role as a reader of Traffic Ramasamy's book, The One Man Army.

Release

The film was released on 22 June 2018 on Vijay's birthday and received mixed reviews from the critics and audience.

Soundtrack
The soundtrack was composed by Balamurali Balu.

See also 

 List of biographical films

References

External links 

2018 directorial debut films
Indian action drama films
Indian biographical drama films
2010s Tamil-language films
2018 biographical drama films
Films scored by Balamurali Balu
2018 action drama films